The southern barred minnow (Opsaridium peringueyi) is a species of cyprinid fish found in Mozambique, South Africa, and Eswatini.

References

southern barred minnow
Fish of Mozambique
Fish of South Africa
Fish of Eswatini
southern barred minnow
Taxa named by John Dow Fisher Gilchrist
Taxa named by William Wardlaw Thompson
Taxonomy articles created by Polbot